Following is a list of Apple II games. The Apple II had a large user base and was a popular game development platform in the 1970s, 1980s and early 1990s.

See here for a list of 16-bit Apple IIGS games.

There are currently  games on this list. This number is always up to date by this script.

List

See also
List of Apple II application software
List of Apple IIGS games
Lists of video games

References

External links
List of Apple II games from MobyGames

Apple II